SQUAREAT is a Florida-based American healthy food company that sells food packaged as small square blocks. The size and shape of the 45-gram food portions is the same for all the various packaged foods, regardless of contents. The company sells them packed as meal boxes consisting of six squares.

References

External links 
 

Food companies
2020 establishments in Florida
Convenience food companies